Kappaladoddi is a village in Krishna district of the Indian state of Andhra Pradesh. It is located in Vijayawada (rural) mandal. It is renowned for its Kalamkari works and the traditional Handloom arts.

Culture 

It is very influenced by the culture and its practices. People of different religions reside in Kappaladoddi, but majority belongs to Hindu. People speak Telugu language and Urdu. Many artists perform dramatics. Navaratri, Diwali, Sankranthi, Ugadi, etc. are the important festivals celebrated. Mainly Dasara is  celebrated with a lot of enthusiasm and belief.one of best festival in village.

Nearly 70% of the families in Kappaladoddi are traditional handloom weaver, and many of these weavers were forced into poverty and suicide due to the globalised economy where machine-clothes are produced cheaper.

Kalamkari 
Along side the traditional handloom work, renowned Machilipatnam Kalamkari is also a main occupation of the residents. The village was registered as one of the geographical indication from Andhra Pradesh under handicraft goods by Geographical Indications of Goods (Registration and Protection) Act, 1999.

Education
There is a school which is run by the Government of Andhra Pradesh. An Anganwadi institute is also set up in the village for the welfare of the children of the village who are below 5 years.

Politics 
Kappaladoddi comes under Pedana Constituency. It is a panchayat. The current surpanch/president of the village is Mrs. Yakkala Madhavi.

References

Villages in Krishna district